Dichloro[1,2-bis(diphenylphosphino)ethane]nickel is a coordination complex with the formula NiCl2(dppe); where dppe is the diphosphine 1,2-bis(diphenylphosphino)ethane. It is used as a reagent and as a catalyst. The compound is a bright orange-red diamagnetic solid.  The complex adopts a square planar geometry.

It is prepared by combining equimolar portions of nickel(II) chloride hexahydrate with dppe:
Ni(H2O)6Cl2  +  dppe   →   NiCl2(dppe)  +  6 H2O

See also
 Dichloro(1,3-bis(diphenylphosphino)propane)nickel

References

Nickel complexes
Phosphine complexes
Chloro complexes